Walter Raymond "Ray" Beck, Jr. (December 7, 1932—December 31, 2014), was a member of the Maryland House of Delegates from District 39.

Walter Raymond Beck, Jr. was born in Chicago, Illinois. He graduated from Downers Grove High School in Downers Grove, Illinois in 1950. He graduated from the United States Naval Academy in 1954. He retired from the United States Navy in 1984 and worked for Vitro Corporation as a consultant. He served in the Maryland House of Delegates from 1994 to 1999 and was a Republican. In 2007, Beck and his wife moved to Lewes, Delaware. Beck died in Lewes, Delaware.

Election results
1994 Race for Maryland House of Delegates – District 39
Voters to choose three:
{| class="wikitable"
!Name
!Votes
!Percent
!Outcome
|-
|-
|Mathew Mossburg, Rep.
|13,119
|  17%
|   Won
|-
|-
|W. Raymond Beck, Rep.
|12,311
|  16%
|   Won
|-
|-
|Barrie S. Ciliberti, Rep.
|12,897
|  16%
|   Won
|-
|-
|Charles E. Barkley, Dem.
|12,137
|  15%
|   Lost
|-
|-
|Anise Key Brown, Dem.
|10,987
|  14%
|   Lost
|-
|-
|Anthony J. Santangelo, Dem.
|10,939
|  14%
|   Lost
|-
|-
|Patricia Cummings, Ind.
|6,471
|  8%
|   Lost
|}

References and notes

Republican Party members of the Maryland House of Delegates
Military personnel from Illinois
Politicians from Chicago
United States Naval Academy alumni
1932 births
2014 deaths